Hadrami may refer to:


People
 Ahmed Al-Hadrami (born 1988), Saudi footballer
 Al-Ala'a Al-Hadrami, 7th century Muslim emissary
 Salit bin 'Amr 'Ala bin Hadrami, 7th-century Muslim emissary to Bahrain
 Al-Imam al-Hadrami, 11th century Muslim jurist
 Hadramis or Arab Sinaporeans

Places
 Hadrami Sheikhdom, in Southern Arabia
 Hadrami, Sanaa, San‘a’ Governorate, Yemen

Other uses
 Hadrami language, an Old South Arabian subgroup of Semitic

See also
 Hadhrami (disambiguation)

Arabic-language surnames